Anton Vogel (21 July 1913 – 27 November 1971) was an Austrian wrestler. He competed in two events at the 1948 Summer Olympics.

References

External links
 

1913 births
1971 deaths
Austrian male sport wrestlers
Olympic wrestlers of Austria
Wrestlers at the 1948 Summer Olympics